The Tamil Nadu State Film Award for Best Make-up Artist is given by the state government as part of its annual Tamil Nadu State Film Awards for Tamil  (Kollywood) films.

The list
Here is a list of the award winners and the films for which they won.

See also
 Tamil cinema
 Cinema of India

References

Actor
Film awards for makeup and hairstyling